The Hayters Hill Nature Reserve is a protected nature reserve that is located in the Northern Rivers region in the state of New South Wales, in eastern Australia.

Features and location
The reserve is one of a few small nature reserves including the Andrew Johnston Big Scrub, Victoria Park, Davis Scrub, Boatharbour and Wilsons Peak flora and nature reserves that conserve rainforests typical of the once extensive Big Scrub. The Big Scrub comprised  of lowland subtropical rainforest which was largely cleared for agriculture in the late 19th century.

The reserve is situated on traditional country of the indigenous Arakwal people.

See also

 Protected areas of New South Wales

References

External links

Forests of New South Wales
Nature reserves in New South Wales
Northern Rivers
Protected areas established in 1989
1989 establishments in Australia